Hope Vale (also known as Hopevale) is a town within the Aboriginal Shire of Hope Vale and a coastal locality split between the Aboriginal Shire of Hope Vale and the Shire of Cook, both in Queensland, Australia. It is an Aboriginal community.

Geography 

History
Guugu Yimithirr (also known as Koko Yindjir, Gugu Yimidhirr, Guguyimidjir) is an Australian Aboriginal language of Hope Vale and the Cooktown area. The language region includes the local government area of the Aboriginal Shire of Hope Vale and the Shire of Cook, particularly the localities of Cape Bedford, Battle Camp and sections of the Normanby River and Annan River.

The Cape Bedford Mission was established by Johann Flierl, a missionary of the Lutheran Church in 1886, with the settlement at Elim on the beach.

Owing to fears that the German-influenced Aboriginal people might cooperate with the advancing Japanese in World War II, the total population of 286 was evacuated south to various communities by the military in May 1942. The German Lutheran missionaries were sent to internment camps. Most of the people were sent to Woorabinda, near Rockhampton, in Queensland, where a large number reportedly perished from disease and malnutrition. Hope Vale was re-established as a Lutheran mission in September 1949. Aboriginal people from the Hope Valley and Cape Bedford Missions settled there. A work crew was allowed to return in 1949 and the first families came home in 1950. 
Hopevale Post Office opened on 1 May 1965 and closed in 1990.

Hopevale is no longer run as a mission by the church but by its own elected community council. In 1986 it received a "deed of grant in trust" (DOGIT) which "granted title to 110,000 ha of land which was previously Aboriginal Reserve Land held by the Under Secretary as trustee, to the community council to act as trustees of the land for the benefit of the residents." The Aboriginal Land Act 1991 (Qld) transferred into Indigenous ownership all previous reserve land under DOGIT (Deed of Grant in Trust) titles.

"The Warra people of the Hopevale Community of Eastern Cape York Peninsula in Queensland received acknowledgement of their native title rights in December 1997. The determination recognised rights of exclusive possession, occupation use and enjoyment over 110,000 ha. (Native Title Determination, Warra Peoples, Hope Vale Community of Cape York (NNTT ref# QC96/15))"

Hopevale is home to several clan groups who mostly speak Guugu Yimidhirr and other related languages, as well as English.

The Hope Vale community has a strong choral singing tradition since its evacuation to Woorabinda. The ensemble has performed at the Queensland Music Festival on three occasions—in 2005, 2007 and 2009.

Education

Hope Vale has a primary (Preparation to Grade 6) campus of Cape York Aboriginal Australian Academy, which is headquartered at the corner of Thiele and Poland Streets in Cairns.

There is no secondary school in Hope Vale. The nearest secondary school is Cooktown State School in neighbouring Cooktown to the south.

On 21 July 2008 the Hope Vale community opened the Indigenous Knowledge and Technology Centre, in the Jack Bambie building at 5 Muni Street. The now-Indigenous Knowledge Centre was established in partnership with Hope Vale Aboriginal Shire Council, the State Library of Queensland, Dot Com Mob, SJB Architects, Work Ventures, and the AMP Foundation.  This centre provides a library service, training venue, and public Internet access.

Notable people

 Eric Deeral (1932–2012), who was the second Australian Aboriginal person elected to an Australian parliament and the first to a state parliament. 

 Queensland rugby league player Matt Bowen (born 1982). 

 Lawyer and activist Noel Pearson (born 1965), who has criticised the level of violence in the community.

Gallery

See also

 List of Indigenous Australian politicians
 Marie Yamba Aboriginal Mission, a mission situated south of Proserpine that commenced in 1897 and finished in 1902 with 24 Aboriginals being moved to Hope Vale Mission.

References

External links

"A War of Hope" (2015). A 52-minute documentary on the life of Elder and artist, Roy McIvor, telling of the cruel forced removal of the Cape Bedford Mission Aboriginal people in 1942, their return in 1949 - a story of great suffering and reconciliation
Aboriginal Co-ordinating Council website.

 University of Queensland: Queensland Places: Hope Vale Aboriginal Shire Council
 State Library of Queensland, John Oxley Library Blog, 2009. Queensland Stories - Three new digital stories
 State Library of Queensland, John Oxley Library Blog, 2017. 75th Anniversary of the Hope Valley Evacuation
 Weaving Exchange: Erub Island and Hopevale, footage of weaving workshop run by a group of weavers from Erub, Torres Strait and Hope Vale, Cape York. Available on State Library of Queensland catalogue

Towns in Queensland
Populated places in Far North Queensland
Australian Aboriginal missions
Aboriginal communities in Queensland
Queensland in World War II
Shire of Cook
Aboriginal Shire of Hope Vale
Coastline of Queensland
Localities in Queensland